is a subway station in Itabashi, Tokyo, Japan, operated by Tokyo Metro.

Lines

Station layout
The station consists of an island platform serving two tracks. The platforms are equipped with waist-height platform edge doors. The station is wheelchair-accessible.

Platforms

History

The station opened as Eidan-Narimasu Station on June 24, 1983 as the terminus of the Yūrakuchō Line from Shintomichō. It became a through station when the line was extended to Wakōshi on August 25, 1987.

The Yūrakuchō New Line (the predecessor of today's Fukutoshin Line) began serving the station on December 7, 1994.

The station gained its current name when the Teito Rapid Transit Authority (known as Teito Kōsokudo Kōtsū Eidan in Japanese) was privatised and became Tokyo Metro on April 1, 2004. The Yūrakuchō New Line was extended and renamed on June 14, 2008.

Waist-height platform edge doors were installed in October 2010.

Surrounding area
 Narimasu Station (on the Tōbu Tōjō Line)

References

External links

 Tokyo Metro station information 

Railway stations in Japan opened in 1983
Stations of Tokyo Metro
Tokyo Metro Yurakucho Line
Tokyo Metro Fukutoshin Line
Railway stations in Tokyo